Howard Hinton may refer to:

 John Howard Hinton, (1791–1873), English author and Baptist minister
 Howard Hinton, (1867-1948), Australian art patron and benefactor
 Howard Everest Hinton, (1912–1977), British entomologist and Fellow of the Royal Society